Marius Šavelskis (born 30 July 1994) is a race walker who competes internationally for Lithuania.

He represented Lithuania at the 2010 Summer Youth Olympics. In 2015 Šavelskis broke his personal best and reached qualification standard for 2016 Summer Olympics.

Personal bests

References

External links

1994 births
Living people
Lithuanian male racewalkers
People from Druskininkai
Athletes (track and field) at the 2010 Summer Youth Olympics
World Athletics Championships athletes for Lithuania
Athletes (track and field) at the 2016 Summer Olympics
Olympic athletes of Lithuania